Eudesicrinidae is a family of echinoderms belonging to the order Millericrinida.

Genera:
 Eudesicrinus Loriol, 1882
 Proeudesicrinus Améziane-Cominardi & Bourseau, 1990

References

Cyrtocrinida
Echinoderm families